A Women's Twenty20 International is a 20 overs-per-side cricket match played in a maximum of 150 minutes between two of the top 10 ranked countries of the International Cricket Council (ICC) in terms of women's cricket. The first women's Twenty20 International match was held in August 2004 between England and New Zealand, six months before the first Twenty20 International match was played between two men's teams. A Twenty20 International can have three possible results: it can be won by one of the two teams, it could be tied, or it could be declared to have "no result". For a match to finish as a tie, both teams must have scored the same number of runs. The number of wickets lost is not considered. Although such matches are recorded as ties, a tiebreak is played; prior to December 2008, this was a bowl-out, and since then it has been a Super Over.

The first tied women's T20I occurred on 18 October 2006, between New Zealand and the Australia, hosted at Allan Border Field in Brisbane. Australia won the resulting bowl-out, and were awarded two points, the equivalent of a win. This was also the only women's T20I match which has been decided by bowl-out. The next tie, involving England and Australia, happened during the group stages of the 2010 ICC Women's World Twenty20. This was the first instance of Super Over in a women's international. Both Australia and England scored 6 runs in their extra over. However, as Australia has hit more sixes (1, compared to England's 0), they have declared winner of the match. 

On 4 September 2019, a T20I between Nigeria and Rwanda was ended in a tie. However, Nigeria team refused to play super-over and Rwanda was declared winner of the match.

 there have been 13 tied women's Twenty20 Internationals. West Indies have played in the most, six, and on three of those instances they were facing Pakistan. Only one tie have taken place during ICC Women's World Twenty20 tournaments.

Tied matches

Count by country

See also
 Tied Test
 List of tied Twenty20 Internationals
 List of tied One Day Internationals

Notes

References

Women's cricket-related lists
Ties